Bagh-e Taj (also Romanized as Bāgh-e Tāj) is a village in Eram Rural District, Eram District, Dashtestan County, Bushehr Province, Iran. At the 2006 census, its population was 271, in 49 families.

References 

Populated places in Dashtestan County